Kootenichela deppi is an extinct arthropod described from the Middle Cambrian of the Kootenay National Park, Canada. It is originally considered to be a member of "great appendage arthropods", although subsequent studies questioned its affinity. Kootenichela appears to be the sister taxon of Worthenella, from cladistic analysis.

The species name deppi comes from the actor Johnny Depp, after his role as Edward Scissorhands in the film of the same name. David Legg, the discoverer of Kootenichela, said:

Kootenichela appears to be a primitive arthropod. It has an elongated body composed of at least 29 segments of similar shape and appearance. On the head, there are large eyes supported by stalks and an appendage resembling an antenna. The appendages bound to the trunk are poorly sclerotised. Most prominent are the claw-like, spinose cephalic appendages, which seem to suggest affinities with Megacheira, the "great appendage" arthropods. However, study in 2015 researchers could not confirm neither the head configuration nor the megacheiran interpretation of the anatomy. Kootenichela has been subsequently suggested to be a chimera of various arthropods such as a bivalved arthropod.

See also
 List of organisms named after famous people (born 1950–present)

References

Megacheira
Prehistoric arthropod genera
Cambrian arthropods
Monotypic arthropod genera
Fossils of Canada
Paleozoic life of British Columbia